Garet Djebilet (also written Gâra Djebilet) is a settlement in the commune of Tindouf, in Tindouf Province, Algeria.

References

Neighbouring towns and cities

Populated places in Tindouf Province